The 1972–73 SM-sarja season was the 42nd season of the SM-sarja, the top level of ice hockey in Finland. 10 teams participated in the league, and Jokerit Helsinki won the championship.

Regular season

External links
 Season on hockeyarchives.info

Fin
Liiga seasons
1972–73 in Finnish ice hockey